Largentière (Occitan: L'Argentièira) is a subprefecture and  commune of the Ardèche department in the Auvergne-Rhône-Alpes region in Southern France.

It is located in the narrow valley of the Ligne, approximately 10 km (6.2 mi) southwest of Aubenas. With a population of 1,587 as of 2019, Largentière is the second-least populated subprefecture in France after Castellane in Alpes-de-Haute-Provence.

Its name, adopted in the 13th century in place of its more ancient name Segualeriae (Ségualières), refers to the silver mines in the area between the 10th and 15th centuries, when the silver-bearing lead ores in intrusive veins in the Largentières sandstone were exploited under the authority of the Counts of Toulouse and the Bishops of Viviers, whose title Barons de Largentière was linked to the bishopric.

Demographics

Economy and transportation
A busy industrial town in the nineteenth century, when it housed silk mills its principal industry is now tourism.  Its only railroad station was rased in 1982, leaving the town accessible only by road.

Sights
Besides its twelfth- to fifteenth-century château, the town conserves its thirteenth-century church, Nôtre-Dame-des-Pommiers, its Renaissance hôtel de ville, its palais de justice, and the Tour Argentière that collected the mines' produce for guarded transport.

Personalities
 Joseph ben Abba Mari ben Joseph ben Jacob Caspi (1279—1340), a prominent Jewish medieval philosopher.

See also
Communes of the Ardèche department

References

External links
Tourism site
Largentière on the departmental site

Communes of Ardèche
Subprefectures in France
Vivarais
Ardèche communes articles needing translation from French Wikipedia